NCK may refer to the following:

 NCK, Newton Chambers and Co Ltd. of Sheffield, England
 Nicolet Chartrand Knoll, a Canadian engineering and consulting firm; structural engineer for Altitude Montreal
 NCK1, the non-catalytic region of tyrosine kinase adaptor protein 1
 National Centre for Knowledge on Men's Violence against Women, abbreviated NCK, a Swedish research and knowledge centre 
 Binomial coefficient, abbreviated nCk (n choose k)
 Network Control Key, used for unlocking mobile phones and modems.